Anna Kathryn Holbrook (née York; born April 18, 1957, Fairbanks, Alaska) is an American soap opera actress, known for her role as Sharlene Frame Hudson on Another World.

Career
Holbrook portrayed Sharlene Frame Hudson on Another World from 1988 to 1991, 1993 to 1997, and again in 1999. The character Sharlene was a victim of sexual abuse and suffered from multiple personality disorder, and Holbrook won a Daytime Emmy Award for Outstanding Supporting Actress award for her portrayal in 1996.

Holbrook has appeared in numerous guest starring roles on Law & Order and Law & Order: Special Victims Unit between 1993 and 2006, as well as the 1994 film I Love Trouble. She played Sally O'Neal in a 2004 episode of The West Wing, and Dr. Hannah Young on the daytime soap opera One Life to Live for several episodes in 2007.

Holbrook played Lisa Dowd in a 2018 episode of Blue Bloods, and in 2020 appeared as Robin on the Showtime series Homeland in the season eight episode "Deception Indicated". Holbrook has also appeared in off-Broadway and regional theater.

In 2021, Holbrook played Debbie in the Sister Swap film franchise. She starred as the mother of real-life sisters Kimberly Williams-Paisley and Ashley Williams, who also happen to be the real-life daughters of Holbrook's real-life best friend.

Personal life
Holbrook's father, Don Joseph York (aged 29) was killed in South Vietnam during the Vietnamese War. Her mother, Johanna, later remarried.

Holbrook has been married to Bruce Holbrook since 1979, and they have two children. Anna is currently an acting teacher at the Performing Arts Conservatory in New Canaan, Connecticut.

References

External links
 
 
 Holbrook family info, legacy.com; accessed July 4, 2015.

1957 births
Living people
American stage actresses
American film actresses
American soap opera actresses
Daytime Emmy Award winners
Daytime Emmy Award for Outstanding Supporting Actress in a Drama Series winners
Actresses from Connecticut
Actresses from Alaska
21st-century American women